Ono is an unincorporated community located in Russell County, Kentucky, United States.

The community may be named after the biblical place of Ono, according to local history.

References

Unincorporated communities in Russell County, Kentucky
Unincorporated communities in Kentucky